Robert Franklin Wilner (April 10, 1889 – March 25, 1960) was an Episcopal Suffragan Bishop of the Philippine Islands.

He was born in Forty Fort, Pennsylvania to George Mortimer Wilner and Lillian Isabel Wilner (née Price). He married Alfaretta Amburn Stark on April 10, 1917.

He was consecrated on January 25, 1938 in the Cathedral Church of Saints Mary and John, Manila. He died in Tunkhannock, Pennsylvania.

Consecrators

 Gouverneur Frank Mosher
 Charles S. Reifsnider
 Ronald Owen Hall

1889 births
1960 deaths
People from Luzerne County, Pennsylvania
20th-century American Episcopalians
Episcopal bishops of the Philippine Islands